Harrison Stiles Fairchild (August 4, 1820 – January 25, 1901), was a colonel and brevet brigadier general in the Union Army during the American Civil War. He commanded a brigade in Charles A. Heckman's Second Division of the XVIII Corps at the Battle of Chaffin's Farm.

References

Sources

External links

Union Army colonels
1820 births
1901 deaths
People from Cazenovia, New York
Burials at Mount Hope Cemetery (Rochester)